Oury may refer to:

Places
Oury, Burkina Faso, a town in Burkina Faso
Oury Department, the surrounding department in Balé Province, Burkina Faso
Aly Oury, a town in Senegal
Saint-Martin-du-Mesnil-Oury, a commune in Normandy, France

People
Gérard Oury (1919–2006), French film director
Granville Henderson Oury (1825–1891), American politician
Fernand Oury (1920–1997), French teacher
Jean Oury (1924–2014), French psychiatrist
Anna Caroline Oury (1808–1880), German-French pianist
Oury Jalloh (1968–2005), asylum seeker from Sierra Leone, died in police cell in Dessau, Germany